52 Herculis is a triple star system in the northern constellation of Hercules. It is visible to the naked eye as a faint point of light with a combined apparent visual magnitude of 4.82. Based upon parallax measurements, the system is located 180 light years away from the Sun. It is moving closer to the Earth with a heliocentric radial velocity of −1.6 km/s.

The primary member, designated component A, is a magnetic chemically peculiar star with a stellar classification of A1VpSiSrCr, appearing as an A-type main-sequence star with abnormal abundances of silicon, strontium, and chromium. It is an alpha2 Canum Venaticorum variable that ranges in brightness from visual magnitude 4.78 down to 4.85 with a period of 3.8567 days. The star is about 525 million years old with a projected rotational velocity of 23 km/s. It has 2.2 times the mass of the Sun and 2.3 times the Sun's radius. The star is radiating 29.5 times the Sun's luminosity from its photosphere at an effective temperature of 8,840 K.

The brighter member of this pair is a suspected K-type main-sequence star with a class of K0V.

References

A-type main-sequence stars
Ap stars
Alpha2 Canum Venaticorum variables
K-type main-sequence stars
Triple stars
Hercules (constellation)
Durchmusterung objects
Herculis, 052
152107
082321
6254
Herculis, V637